The following is a list of Corps of the Imperial German Army

Background

Regular

 Guards
 I
 II
 III
 IV
 V
 VI
 VII
 VIII
 IX
 X
 XI
 XII (1st Royal Saxon)
 XIII (Royal Württemberg)
 XIV (Grand Ducal Baden) 
 XV
 XVI
 XVII
 XVIII
 XIX (2nd Royal Saxon)
 XX
 XXI

Reserve

 Guards
 I
 III
 IV
 V
 VI
 VII
 VIII
 IX
 X
 XII
 XIV
 XV
 XVII
 XVIII
 XXII
 XXIII
 XXIV
 XXV
 XXVI
 XXVII
 XXXVIII
 XXXIX
 XXXX
 XXXXI

Bavarian
 I
 II
 III
 I Reserve
 II Reserve
 XV Reserve

Cavalry
 I
 II
 III
 IV
 V
 VI
 Schmettow

General Commands for Special Use

 51st
 52nd
 53rd
 54th
 55th
 56th
 57th
 58th
 59th
 60th
 61st
 62nd
 63rd
 64th
 65th
 66th
 67th
 68th

Other
 Landwehr
 Ersatz
 Naval

See also
List of Divisions of the Imperial German Army
World War I

References

German Army (German Empire)
Corps of Germany